Football is the most popular sport in Italy. The Italy national football team is considered to be one of the best national teams in the world. They have won the FIFA World Cup four times (1934, 1938, 1982, 2006), trailing only Brazil (with 5), runners-up in two finals (1970, 1994) and reaching a third place (1990) and a fourth place (1978). They have also won two European Championships (1968 and 2020), also appearing in two finals (2000, 2012), finished third at the Confederations Cup (2013), won one Olympic football tournament (1936) and two Central European International Cups (1927–30 and 1933–35).

Italy's top domestic league, the Serie A, is one of the most popular professional sports leagues in the world and it is often depicted as the most tactical national football league. Italy's club sides have won 48 major European trophies, making them the second most successful nation in European football. Serie A hosts three of the world's most famous clubs as Juventus, Milan and Inter, all founding members of the G-14, a group which represented the largest and most prestigious European football clubs; Serie A was the only league to produce three founding members.

Juventus, Milan and Inter, along with Roma, Fiorentina, Lazio and historically Parma, but now Napoli, are known as the Seven Sisters of Italian football.

Italian managers are among the most successful in European Football, especially in competitions such as the Champions League. More players have won the coveted Ballon d'Or award while playing in Serie A than any other league in the world, except La Liga.

History 

Other forms of football were played in Italy in ancient times, the earliest of which was Harpastum, played during the times of the Roman Empire. This game may have also been influential to other forms throughout Europe due to the expansion of the Empire, including Medieval football. From the 16th century onwards, Calcio Fiorentino, another code of football distinct from the modern game, was played in the Piazza Santa Croce in Florence. Some famous Florentines were amongst players of the game, particularly the Medici family including Piero, Lorenzo and Alessandro de' Medici. As well as Popes such as Clement VII, Leo XI and Urban VIII who played the game in the Vatican.  The name calcio ("kick") was later adopted for football in Italy (attested first in 1889 : "Il Foot-ball ovvero il Giuoco del Calcio"), becoming the synonim of italian association football worldwide.

Italian football is born: Turin and Genoa 
The modern variation of the game was brought to Italy during the 1880s. Edoardo Bosio, a merchant worker in the British textile industry, had visited England and experienced the game. He returned to Turin in 1887 and was motivated to help spread football in his homeland. He founded the first football club in Italy - Torino Football and Cricket Club - that year, while Nobili Torino ("Turin Nobles") soon followed. The second club bore the name of noble because it contained the Duke of the Abruzzi and Alfonso Ferrero di Ventimiglia (who would later become a president of Italian Football Federation (FIGC)). The two merged in 1891 to form Internazionale Football Club Torino,

Genoa Cricket and Football Club, formed as a cricket club to represent England abroad, was founded by Englishmen in 1893. Three years later in 1896 a man named James Richardson Spensley arrived in Genoa and introduced the football section of the club, becoming its first manager.

Some early tournaments were organised by FNGI between 1895 and 1897. In 1898 a new federation FIGC (as FIF, Federazione Italiana del Foot-ball, until 1909) had been formed, with its center originally in Turin and the first president as Mario Vicary. The FIGC created the Italian Football Championship with the four founder clubs being; Genoa, FBC Torinese, Ginnastica Torino and Internazionale Torino. Its first competition was held at Velodromo Umberto I in Turin on 8 May 1898, and was won by Genoa. While it was common for clubs to compete in both FIGC and FNGI competitions early on, the titles won in the FIGC championship are the only ones officially recognised by the modern day league.

In the following years, the tournament (called Prima Categoria) was structured into regional groups with the winners of each group participating in a playoff with the eventual winners being declared champions. Until 1904 the tournament was dominated by Genoa, who won 6 titles in 7 years. Between 1905 and 1908 a Final Group among regional champions was contested to award the title and the Spensley Cup. Juventus won his first title and Spensley Cup in 1905, but the two following championships were won by Milan.

The Italianisation and the "split" of the Championship 
In November 1907, the FIF organised two championships in the same season:
Italian Championship, the main tournament where only Italian players were allowed to play; the winners would be proclaimed Campioni d'Italia (Italian Champions) and would be awarded the Coppa Buni
Federal Championship, a secondary tournament where foreign players (if they lived in Italy) were also allowed to play; the winners would be proclaimed Campioni Federali (Federal Champions) and would be awarded the Coppa Spensley
The FIF wanted to organize two different championships in order to allow weaker clubs - composed only of Italian players ("squadre pure italiane", "pure Italian teams")  - to win the national title, and to relegate simultaneously the big clubs, composed mostly of stronger foreign players ("squadre spurie internazionali", "spurious international teams") in a minor competition for a "consolation prize". The majority of big clubs (Genoa, Torino and Milan) withdrew from both the championships in order to protest against the autocratic policy of the FIF. The Federal Championship was won by Juventus against Doria, while The Italian Championship 1908 and Coppa Buni were won by Pro Vercelli, beating Juventus, Doria and US Milanese. However, the Federal Championship won by Juventus was later forgotten by FIGC, due to the boycott by the dissident clubs.

In 1909 season, the two different championships were organised again, with Coppa Oberti in lieu of Coppa Spensley for the Federal Championship. This time, the majority of big clubs decided to only withdraw from Italian Championship, in order to make the Federal competition the most relevant tournament, and to diminish the Italian one. The Federal Championship was won by Pro Vercelli, beating US Milanese in the Final, while the Italian Championship was won by Juventus, again beating US Milanese in the Final. However, the dissenters' strategy worked out: the failure of the Italian Championship won by Juventus forced FIGC to later recognized the Federal Champions of Pro Vercelli as "Campioni d'Italia 1909", disavowing the other tournament.

The format was modified for the 1909–10 season which was played in a league format. Nine clubs participated, playing each other both home and away. The split between Federal and Italian championship was not completely abolished, because, while unifying these tournaments, it was decided for the last time to assign two titles at the end of the season. In fact, FIGC established to proclaim as Federal Champions (now turned into the main title) the first-placed club in the general classification, while recognized as Italian Champions (now become the secondary title) would be the best placed club among the four "pure Italian teams", depending on the head-to-head matches. At the end of the season, Pro Vercelli and Inter finished joint-top, so a playoff was needed in order to assign the Federal title (the Italian one was won by Pro Vercelli). This season was the first victory for Internazionale, who defeated Pro Vercelli in the final by a score of 10–3. Even the Italian title won by Pro Vercelli was later forgotten.

National championship 

A first national competition organized by the Italian Federation of Gymnastics (F.N.G.I.) was played in 1896 and won by the S. Udinese G.S. team from Udine (north east Italy, Friuli-Venezia Giulia Region). In 1897, a second national gymnastic-football tournament was staged by the FNGI and was won by S.G. Torinese. In 1898 the Federazione Italiana del Foot-ball (FIF – FIGC) was finally formed and the first national championship was organized, with regional tournaments and playoffs. This is considered to be the first proper national football championship and was won by Genoa.

National teams

The Italy national football team, called Azzurri or squadra azzurra for their blue shirts, are the second-most successful national team in the world. During the 1970s to early 1990s Italy became famous for their catenaccio, thus heralding a long line of world class defenders such as Virginio Rosetta, Pietro Rava, Carlo Parola, Giacinto Facchetti, Armando Picchi, Gaetano Scirea, Antonio Cabrini, Claudio Gentile, Franco Baresi, Giuseppe Bergomi, Paolo Maldini, Alessandro Nesta, Fabio Cannavaro, Andrea Barzagli, Leonardo Bonucci and Giorgio Chiellini

A women's team, an under-21 team, an under-20 team, an under-19 team, and an under-17 team also compete.

Their honours include:

World Champions squads
1934 FIFA World Cup squad
1938 FIFA World Cup squad
1982 FIFA World Cup squad
2006 FIFA World Cup squad

European Champions squads
UEFA Euro 1968 squad
UEFA Euro 2020 squad

European competitions for clubs 
 12 UEFA European Cups/Champions League won in 28 finals (third behind Spain and England)
 7 UEFA Cup Winners' Cups won in 11 finals (first is England with 8/13)
 9 UEFA Cups won in 15 finals (second behind Spain)
 1 UEFA Europa Conference League won in 1 final
 9 UEFA Super Cups won in 12 finals (second behind Spain)
 9 Intercontinental/Club World Cups (third behind Spain and Brazil)

In Total:
 Italy, 47 cups and 67 finals (second behind Spain)

UEFA Champions League 
The following teams have reached the final of the European Cup / UEFA Champions League.

 Internazionale (1963–64 – Winners, 1964–65 – Winners, 1966–67 – Runners-up, 1971–72 – Runners-up, 2009–10 – Winners)
 Fiorentina (1956–57 – Runners-up)
 Milan (1957–58 – Runners-up, 1962–63 – Winners, 1968–69 – Winners, 1988–89 – Winners, 1989–90 – Winners, 1992–93 – Runners-up, 1993–94 – Winners, 1994–95 – Runners-up, 2002–03 – Winners, 2004–05 – Runners-up, 2006–07 – Winners)
 Juventus (1972–73 – Runners-up, 1982–83 – Runners-up, 1984–85 – Winners, 1995–96 – Winners, 1996–97 – Runners-up, 1997–98 – Runners-up, 2002–03 – Runners-up, 2014–15 – Runners-up, 2016–17 – Runners-up)
 Roma (1983–84 – Runners-up)
 Sampdoria (1991–92 – Runners-up)

+40,000-capacity Italian football stadiums

References

Further reading 
 Carlo Chiesa, La grande storia del calcio italiano , published in installments on Il Guerin Sportivo, April 2012.

External links 

 

 

lt:Italijos futbolo sistema